H. petiolaris may refer to:
 Hakea petiolaris, the sea-urchin hakea, a shrub or small tree species endemic to the south-west of Western Australia
 Helianthus petiolaris, the prairie sunflower, a plant species in the genus Helianthus
 Hydrangea petiolaris, a species native to the woodlands of Japan, Korea and Sakhalin in easternmost Siberia
 Hylaeorchis petiolaris, a species in the genus Hylaeorchis

See also
 Petiolaris (disambiguation)